Let's Call the Whole Thing Orff is a Canadian comedy television series which aired on CBC Television from 1971 to 1972.

Premise
This Montreal-produced series derived its title from a Toronto Telegram quotation by television columnist Bob Blackburn who suggested a television series name in one of his columns. This was a spin-off from CBC Radio's Funny You Should Say That, although Let's Call the Whole Thing Orff featured only Barrie Baldaro from that radio series unlike the heavier cast reliance for other spin-offs such as Comedy Cafe, Comedy Crackers, and Zut!.

Series regulars were Barrie Baldaro, Andrée Boucher, Yvan Ducharme, Peggy Mahon, Wally Martin and Terrence G. Ross with songs by France Castel and Diane Dufresne. Sketches often concerned the differences between English and French Canadian culture and relied on rapidly executed material. Francois Cousineau conducted the house band.

Scheduling
This half-hour series was broadcast Saturdays at 7:00 p.m. (Eastern) from 18 September 1971 to 20 May 1972.

References

External links
 
 

CBC Television original programming
1971 Canadian television series debuts
1972 Canadian television series endings